Faceless is the fourth album by Australian metalcore band, Buried in Verona. It was released on 7 March 2014 through UNFD and Artery Recordings. Faceless was produced by Joey Sturgis and debuted at No. 15 on the ARIA Albums Chart. This is the first album to feature Conor Ward on drums and the last album to feature Sean Gynn on bass and Daniel Gynn on guitar.

Track listing

Personnel
Credits from AllMusic

Buried in Verona
Brett Anderson – lead vocals
Daniel Gynn – lead guitar
Richie Newman – rhythm guitar, clean vocals, lead vocals track 6
Sean Gynn – bass guitar
Conor Ward – drums

Additional personnel
Joey Sturgis – producer, engineer, mixing, mastering, guest vocals on track 13
Nick Scott – engineer, vocal editing
Tyler Acord – scratching
Jeff Dunne – drum editing
Trevor Fedele – string editing
Elise Linder – cello
Kenneth Trotter – violin
Luke Logemann – A&R
Kane Hibberd – photography
Pat Fox – art direction, design

Charts

References

2014 albums
Buried in Verona albums
Artery Recordings albums
UNFD albums
Albums produced by Joey Sturgis